Cranley Gordon Douglas Onslow, Baron Onslow of Woking,  (8 June 1926 – 13 March 2001) was a British politician and served as the Conservative MP for Woking from 1964 to 1997, and a British Peer from 1997 until his death in 2001.

Family background
Onslow was related to the Earl of Onslow, and was named for one of the subsidiary titles of the Earldom: Viscount Cranley. His parents were Francis Robert Douglas Onslow (1878–1938) and Mabel Strachan (d 1974). He had a younger brother, Ian Denzil Onslow (1929–2013). Onslow was a descendant of George Onslow, eldest son of Lieutenant-General Richard Onslow, nephew of the first Baron and uncle of the first Earl.

Early life and career
He was educated at Harrow School and then Sandhurst. He then joined the military in 1944 and was commissioned as a second lieutenant into the Queen's Own Hussars. Upon completing this service he read history at Oriel College, Oxford. Onslow then joined MI6 as an intelligence officer and had a tour of duty in Burma.

Political career
Onslow resigned from the civil service in 1960 and became active in politics, first being elected to Dartford Rural District Council and later to Kent County Council. In 1963 he was selected to succeed Harold Watkinson as MP for Woking and he was elected the following year in the 1964 general election.

Once elected, Onslow demonstrated his right wing credentials by calling for lower taxes on the middle class and a reduction in third world aid. He also pursued a strong non-partisan interest in aviation, eventually chairing the Conservative aviation committee.

Government
He would later serve as Parliamentary Under Secretary of State for Aerospace from 1972 to 1974 in Edward Heath's government. In Margaret Thatcher's government he was made a Minister of State at the Foreign and Commonwealth Office in 1983, but resigned a year later after his boss, Francis Pym, was sacked by Margaret Thatcher.

1922 Committee
In 1984, he was elected to chair the 1922 Committee, and was therefore considered to be the most powerful backbencher in the Conservative party. In this post, he conveyed to Mrs Thatcher the desire of backbenchers that Leon Brittan should resign over the Westland affair and in the 1990 leadership contest that many backbenchers wanted a broader choice of candidates, contributing to her decision to drop out. This angered many allies of Thatcher, and in 1992 he was forced from his post as chairman of the 1922 Committee.

Honours and styles

Honours
Having been sworn of the Privy Council in the 1988 New Year Honours, Onslow was appointed to the Order of St Michael and St George as a Knight Commander (KCMG) for "political service" in the 1993 New Year Honours and upon stepping down from Parliament in 1997 his life peerage was announced in the Resignation Honours and he was raised to the peerage as Baron Onslow of Woking, of Woking in the County of Surrey.

Marriage
In 1955, he married Lady June Hay, daughter of George Hay, 14th Earl of Kinnoull.

References

 Guardian Obituary
 ThePeerage.com profile

1926 births
2001 deaths
Chairmen of the 1922 Committee
People educated at Harrow School
Graduates of the Royal Military College, Sandhurst
Alumni of Oriel College, Oxford
Knights Commander of the Order of St Michael and St George
Queen's Own Hussars officers
Conservative Party (UK) life peers
Life peers created by Elizabeth II
Members of the Privy Council of the United Kingdom
Conservative Party (UK) MPs for English constituencies
UK MPs 1964–1966
UK MPs 1966–1970
UK MPs 1970–1974
UK MPs 1974
UK MPs 1974–1979
UK MPs 1979–1983
UK MPs 1983–1987
UK MPs 1987–1992
UK MPs 1992–1997
Members of Kent County Council
Cranley
British Army personnel of World War II